Tio Tjay (born 1946 in Jakarta as Tio Hok Tjay) was an Indonesian painter who for a long time has reside in Brazil.  At a very young age, young Tio Tjay enjoy studying Chinese painting and calligraphy.  His talent for art was already sensed by people at youth.

In 1967 he immigrated to  South American with his family.
He held many exhibitions, from São Paulo, Rio de Janeiro, Brasilia and even Paraguay.  In 1971 till 1975 he resided in Manaus, where he befriend with many natives, which gives him an opportunity to enter the Amazon.  It is Amazon Rainforest that really inspire him to draw painting about nature. In 1976, he moved back to São Paulo and participate in the exhibition of Bienal Nacional de São Paulo.

1980's was a great decade for Tio Tjay.  He was invited to join an exhibition in Italy which was held in Naples for a cultural relationship between Brazil and Italy.  A few years later, he was again invited to Tukuyama, Japan for a collective exhibition.  And in the same year, he returned to Indonesia and worked in his birth country.
       
Tio Tjay's strong painting is affected by the Latin colours that was dominant in Brazil.
In Indonesia, he created unique style of art pieces by combining the brave colours of Latin, with an oriental style, applied in the wondrous Indonesia and the exotic and mysterious Amazon.

Notes

1946 births
Living people
Indonesian painters
Indonesian Hokkien people
Indonesian people of Chinese descent
People from Jakarta
Place of birth missing (living people)